Egg Saturday, Egg Feast, or Festum Ovorum is the Saturday before Ash Wednesday.

At the University of Oxford, pasch eggs have been provided for students on that day.

References

Carnivals
Culture of the University of Oxford
Holidays based on the date of Easter
February observances
March observances